Mount Tire'm is a small  mountain adjacent to Keoka Lake in the town of Waterford, Maine.  The Daniel Brown Trail offers access to the summit; its trailhead is on Plummer Hill Road just northwest of the village of Waterford. Views on clear days near the summit include vistas of Keoka Lake and Pleasant Mountain, the home of the Shawnee Peak Ski Area.

References

Mountains of Oxford County, Maine
Mountains of Maine